Clifford George Pearce (1907-1976) was an Australian rugby league footballer who played in the 1920s, 1930s and 1940s.

Club career
He first played for Western Suburbs in 1929 and played 65 games for the club between 1929 and 1937, scoring nineteen tries and kicking six goals. During his time at Western Suburbs, Pearce won a premiership in 1930.

He then played for Norths between 1938 and 1940 where he played five first grade games, scoring three goals.

Representative career
Pearce represented for New South Wales between 1928 and 1933, playing a total of fifteen matches, scoring four tries and two goals.

Pearce represented Australia in 1928 and between the years 1932 and 1934, playing seven Tests against England, scoring one try. That one try came on his international debut in the third Test of the 1928 Ashes series. In 1932 he played in three Tests against England and then he was selected on the 1933-34 Kangaroo tour of Great Britain where he played in all three Tests and 24 other tour matches. On this tour he broke his leg in a promotional match which was played against The Rest team. Due to this injury, he missed Western Suburbs' second premiership title.

Coaching career
Pearce coached North Sydney for two seasons between 1947–1948.

Accolades
In September 2004 Pearce was named at centre in the Western Suburbs Magpies team of the century.

References

External links
Cliff Pearce at rugbyleagueproject.org

Books
 

1907 births
1976 deaths
Australia national rugby league team players
Australian rugby league coaches
Australian rugby league players
North Sydney Bears coaches
North Sydney Bears players
Place of birth missing
Rugby league centres
Rugby league players from New South Wales
Western Suburbs Magpies players